The 1st USSR Federation Cup was brief and took place between 21 September through 4 November. Its final was played at the Republican Stadium in Kishinev.

Group stage

Group A

Group B

Group C

Group D

Knock-out stage

Semifinals

Final

Top scorers

5 goals
 Oleh Taran (Dnepr Dnepropetrovsk)
4 goals
 Yuriy Tarasov (Metallist Kharkov)
2 goals
 Yuriy Sekinayev (Chernomorets Odessa)
 Vladimir Kobzev (Torpedo Moscow)
 Aleksei Yeryomenko
 Oleh Protasov (Dnepr Dnepropetrovsk)
 Boris Chukhlov (Zenit Leningrad)
 Vadym Karatayev (FC Dynamo Kyiv)
 Mykola Kudrytskyi (Dnepr Dnepropetrovsk)
 Anton Shokh (Dnepr Dnepropetrovsk)
 Yaroslav Dumanskyi (Metallist Kharkov)

References

External links
 www.klisf.info 
 www.fc-dynamo.ru 
 1986 season at FootballFacts.ru

1986
1986 in Soviet football
FC Dnipro matches
FC Zenit Saint Petersburg matches